Paróquia São José do Belém is a church located in São Paulo, Brazil. It was established on 14 July 1897.

References

Churches in São Paulo
Roman Catholic churches completed in 1897
19th-century Roman Catholic church buildings in Brazil